Taylor Olson is a Canadian actor, writer and filmmaker from Halifax, Nova Scotia. He is best known as the director, writer and lead actor of the 2020 film Bone Cage, for which he was a Canadian Screen Award nominee for Best Adapted Screenplay at the 9th Canadian Screen Awards.

Early life and education

Before moving to Halifax, Nova Scotia, Taylor Olson was born in Masset, British Columbia. Olson attended Dalhousie University's Fountain School of Performing Arts. He graduated in 2014, with a Bachelor of Arts with Honours in Theatre (Acting). While at the Fountain School, Olson was one of two recipients of the 2012 Andrew and David Stitt Memorial Prize.

Career

Olson has appeared in over 70 films and television shows, and has had supporting or guest roles in the television series Pure, Sex & Violence, Mr. D, Diggstown, Trailer Park Boys, and This Hour Has 22 Minutes, as well as films including Black Cop, Hopeless Romantic, Spinster, Tin Can and Dawn, Her Dad and the Tractor, and the web series I Am Syd Stone.

He has also performed in stage roles in Halifax, including in a 2017 production of Catherine Banks's original theatrical version of Bone Cage, Neptune Theatre's world premiere of Controlled Damage, and Daniel MacIvor's solo play Monster, for which he was nominated for a Theatre Nova Scotia Robert Merritt Awards for Outstanding Lead Performance, 2020, as well as won Best Actor, Best Drama, EFT's Upstage Award and Best Solo Show at the Halifax Fringe Festival, 2019.

Personal life

Olson has one child.

Awards

References

External links

21st-century Canadian male actors
21st-century Canadian male writers
21st-century Canadian screenwriters
Canadian male film actors
Canadian male television actors
Canadian male stage actors
Canadian male screenwriters
Dalhousie University alumni
Film directors from Nova Scotia
Male actors from Halifax, Nova Scotia
Writers from Halifax, Nova Scotia
Living people
1992 births